Baron Selsey, of Selsey in the County of Sussex, was a title in the Peerage of Great Britain. It was created on 13 August 1794 for Sir James Peachey, 4th Baronet, Master of the Robes to King George III. He was succeeded by his son, the second Baron. He represented St Germans and Shoreham in Parliament. His eldest son, the third Baron, was a Captain in the Royal Navy. The titles became extinct on his death in 1838.

The Baronetcy, of Petworth in the County of Sussex, was created in the Baronetage of Great Britain on 21 March 1736 for Henry Peachey, Member of Parliament for Sussex and Midhurst, with remainder in default of male issue of his own to his brother John Peachey and the male issue of his body. Peachey had two sons who predeceased him, unmarried, and was succeeded according to the special remainder by his brother, John, the second Baronet. He subsequently represented Midhurst in Parliament. His elder son, the third Baronet, succeeded his father as Member of Parliament for Midhurst. The latter was childless and was succeeded by his younger brother, the aforementioned fourth Baronet, who was elevated to the peerage in 1794.

Bulstrode Peachey Knight, brother of the first and second Baronets, also sat as Member of Parliament for Midhurst.

Between 1738 and 1871 the Barons Selsey resided at West Dean House, in West Dean, West Sussex. The house has now become West Dean College, dedicated to the arts.

Peachey baronets, of Petworth (1736)
Sir Henry Peachey, 1st Baronet (c. 1671–1737)
Sir John Peachey, 2nd Baronet (c. 1680–1744)
Sir John Peachey, 3rd Baronet (c. 1720–1765)
Sir James Peachey, 4th Baronet (1723–1808) (created Baron Selsey in 1794)

Barons Selsey (1794)
James Peachey, 1st Baron Selsey (1723–1808)
John Peachey, 2nd Baron Selsey (1749–1816)
Henry John Peachey, 3rd Baron Selsey (1787–1838)

References

John Burke. A General and Heraldic Dictionary of the Peerage and Baronetage of the British Empire. Volume II.

Extinct baronies in the Peerage of Great Britain
1736 establishments in Great Britain
Noble titles created in 1794